Canasteros and thistletails are small passerine birds of South America belonging to the genus Asthenes. The name "canastero" comes from Spanish and means "basket-maker", referring to the large, domed nests these species make of sticks or grass. They inhabit shrublands and grasslands in temperate climates from the lowlands to the highlands. They feed on insects and other invertebrates gleaned from the ground or the low vegetation.

Taxonomy
The genus Asthenes was introduced in 1853 by the German naturalist Ludwig Reichenbach. The name is from Ancient Greek asthenēs meaning "insignificant". The type species was designated by George Robert Gray in 1855 as Synallaxis sordida Lesson. This taxon is now considered to be a subspecies of the sharp-billed canastero (Asthenes pyrrholeuca sordida).

In 2010, it was discovered that the thistletails and the Itatiaia spinetail, formerly placed in their own genera (Schizoeaca and Oreophylax, respectively), are actually part of a rapid radiation of long-tailed Asthenes. At the same time, four species, the cactus, dusky-tailed, Steinbach's and Patagonian canasteros, were split off into the new genus Pseudasthenes.

Species
The genus contains 30 species:
 Perijá thistletail (Asthenes perijana)
 White-chinned thistletail (Asthenes fuliginosa)
 Vilcabamba thistletail (Asthenes vilcabambae)
 Ayacucho thistletail (Asthenes ayacuchensis)
 Ochre-browed thistletail (Asthenes coryi)
 Mouse-colored thistletail (Asthenes griseomurina)
 Eye-ringed thistletail (Asthenes palpebralis)
 Puna thistletail (Asthenes helleri)
 Black-throated thistletail (Asthenes harterti)
 Itatiaia spinetail (Asthenes moreirae)
 Sharp-billed canastero (Asthenes pyrrholeuca)
 Short-billed canastero (Asthenes baeri)
 Canyon canastero (Asthenes pudibunda)
 Rusty-fronted canastero (Asthenes ottonis)
 Maquis canastero (Asthenes heterura)
 Cordilleran canastero (Asthenes modesta)
 Streak-throated canastero, (Asthenes humilis)
 Rusty-vented canastero (Asthenes dorbignyi)
 Dark-winged canastero (Asthenes arequipae)
 Pale-tailed canastero (Asthenes huancavelicae)
 Berlepsch's canastero (Asthenes berlepschi)
 Cipo canastero (Asthenes luizae)
 Streak-backed canastero (Asthenes wyatti)
 Puna canastero (Asthenes sclateri)
 Austral canastero (Asthenes anthoides)
 Hudson's canastero (Asthenes hudsoni)
 Line-fronted canastero (Asthenes urubambensis)
 Many-striped canastero (Asthenes flammulata)
 Junín canastero (Asthenes virgata)
 Scribble-tailed canastero (Asthenes maculicauda)

Description
They are mostly dull and brown in colour but vary in tail pattern and presence of streaking. They have trilling songs.

Distribution and habitat
Most species occur in open country, including mesic to arid scrublands and grasslands. Some species inhabit dry forests. Only three species are migratory.

References

Jaramillo, Alvaro; Burke, Peter & Beadle, David (2003) Field Guide to the Birds of Chile, Christopher Helm, London
South American Classification Committee (2007) A classification of the bird species of South America, part 6. Retrieved 17/07/07.

Taxa named by Ludwig Reichenbach